Adam Keefe Horovitz (born October 31, 1966), popularly known as Ad-Rock, is an American rapper, guitarist, and actor. He was a member of the hip-hop group Beastie Boys. While Beastie Boys were active, Horovitz performed with a side project, BS 2000. After the group disbanded in 2012 following the death of member Adam Yauch, Horovitz has participated in a number of Beastie Boys-related projects, worked as a remixer, producer, and guest musician for other artists, and has acted in a number of films.

Early life and education 
Horovitz was born and raised on Park Avenue, Manhattan, New York, the son of Doris (née Keefe) and playwright Israel Horovitz. His sister is film producer Rachael Horovitz. His father was Jewish, whereas his mother, who was of Irish descent, was Roman Catholic. He had a secular upbringing.

Career 

Horovitz began his music career with a stint in the punk rock band The Young and the Useless, who often performed with Beastie Boys. In 1982, Beastie Boys guitarist John Berry quit and Horovitz replaced him. He was only 16 at the time. After Horovitz joined the band, Beastie Boys changed their sound, evolving from a hardcore punk band to a more hip-hop oriented group.  The band was signed to Def Jam, and released their debut album Licensed to Ill in 1986.  The album was a huge commercial success, and spawned six hit singles. Seven albums followed, and by 2010 Beastie Boys had sold 22 million records in the United States alone, and 40 million worldwide. In 2012, Beastie Boys were inducted into the Rock and Roll Hall of Fame.

In addition to his work with Beastie Boys, Horovitz also remixes numerous tracks for other artists under the alias 41 Small Stars. He plays bass in The Tender Moments, the backing band of New York-based cabaret performer Bridget Everett.

Horovitz has acted in several motion pictures and television shows.  Some of his roles include Tim 'Chino' Doolan in Lost Angels (1989), Sam in Roadside Prophets (1992), Repulski in Godspeed (2007), Fletcher in While We're Young (2014), and Nick in Golden Exits (2017).

In 2020, he was featured in the documentary Have a Good Trip.

Personal life 
In the late 1980s, Horovitz was in a relationship with American actress Molly Ringwald. They met on the set of The Pick-up Artist.

Horovitz was married to actress Ione Skye from 1992 to 1995. They separated in 1995 and divorced in 1999.

Since 1996, he has been involved with riot grrrl artist Kathleen Hanna; they married in 2006. Horovitz is featured prominently in The Punk Singer, a 2013 documentary film about Hanna's life and career, even shooting some scenes.

Horovitz began to wear a medical alert bracelet following the tonic–clonic seizure he experienced in 2003.

Discography 

with Beastie Boys
 Licensed to Ill (1986)
 Paul's Boutique (1989)
 Check Your Head (1992)
 Ill Communication (1994)
 Hello Nasty (1998)
 To the 5 Boroughs (2004)
 The Mix-Up (2007)
 Hot Sauce Committee Part Two (2011)

with BS 2000
 BS 2000 (1997)
 Simply Mortified (2000)

Filmography 
 Krush Groove (1985) as himself
 Tougher Than Leather (1988) as himself
 Lost Angels (1989) as Tim 'Chino' Doolan
 A Kiss Before Dying (1991) as Jay Faraday
 Roadside Prophets (1992) as Sam
 Godspeed (2007) as Repulski
 While We're Young (2014) as Fletcher
 808 (2015) as himself
 Golden Exits (2017) as Nick
 Bad Reputation (2018) as himself
 Beastie Boys Story (2020) as himself

References

External links 
 
 
 

1966 births
Living people
Male actors from New York City
Rappers from Manhattan
American people of Irish descent
Alternative hip hop musicians
American male film actors
American male rappers
Jewish American musicians
Jewish punk rock musicians
Jewish rappers
American rock guitarists
American male guitarists
Beastie Boys members
Grammy Award winners
People with epilepsy
Rap rock musicians
21st-century American male actors
20th-century American musicians
20th-century American male actors
Guitarists from New York City
20th-century American guitarists
21st-century American rappers
21st-century American guitarists